Ileana Moschos (born 14 November 1976) is an American-born Greek  former footballer wbho played as a goalkeeper.

Moschos was part of the Greece women's national football team at the 2004 Summer Olympics. On club level she played for California Storm in the United States.

Early life
Moschos was born in Indianapolis, Indiana, United States.

See also
 Greece at the 2004 Summer Olympics

References

External links
 
 http://www.pittsburghpanthers.com/sports/w-soccer/mtt/ileana_moschos_800905.html
 http://www.seminoles.com/ViewArticle.dbml?ATCLID=209579347
 http://ballstatesports.com/news/2011/6/20/205160318.aspx
 http://www.iowastatedaily.com/sports/article_78ede5a5-e7e8-55c3-abac-09a8cd021785.html

1976 births
Living people
Soccer players from Indianapolis
American people of Greek descent
Sportspeople of Greek descent
Citizens of Greece through descent
American women's soccer players
Greek women's footballers
Women's association football goalkeepers
Wofford Terriers women's soccer players
California Storm players
Women's Premier Soccer League players
Greece women's international footballers
Olympic footballers of Greece
Footballers at the 2004 Summer Olympics